is a terminal railway station on the Hakone Tozan Line as well as the Hakone Tozan Cable Car, and is located in Hakone, Kanagawa, Japan. It is 15.0 km from the Hakone Tozan Line's southern terminus at Odawara Station.

Lines
Gōra Station is served by the Hakone Tozan Line and also by the Hakone Tozan Cable Car.

Station layout
Gōra Station has two side platforms, which are staggered, so that they do not directly oppose each other.

History
Gōra Station was opened on June 1, 1919 as a station on the Hakone Tozan Line. The Hakone Tozan Cable Car began operations from December 1, 1921, but operations were suspended from February 11, 1944 through July 1, 1950. The present station building was opened on April 16, 1977.

Bus services
Hakone Tozan Bus
Bus stop 1
 for Hakone Open-Air Museum, Kowaki-en (transfer for Moto-Hakone (Lake Ashi) direction), Yunessun, and Ten-yu
Bus stop 2
 for Gora Park, Hakone Art Museum (Kōen-Kami Station), Pola Museum of Art, The Little Prince and Saint-Exupéry Museum, Senkyoro-mae (transfer for Togendai (Lake Ashi)), Hakone Venetian Glass Museum, Sengoku (transfer for JR Gotemba Station and Shinjuku Station), and Hakone Botanical Garden of Wetlands
Bus stop 3
 for Miyagino, Hakone Venetian Glass Museum, Sengoku (transfer for Shinjuku Station), Otome Toge, Gotemba Premium Outlets, and JR Gotemba Station
Bus stop (Extra)
 for Hakone Yumoto Station via Chōkoku-no-Mori Station, Kowakidani Station, Miyanoshita, and Ohiradai Station

References

External links

 Hakone Tozan Railway official website
 Hakone Tozan Bus official website (Gora Station)
 Gora Station Map (Hakone Navi)

Railway stations in Japan opened in 1919
Railway stations in Kanagawa Prefecture
Buildings and structures in Hakone, Kanagawa